REM (Real Estate Magazine) is a monthly Canadian real estate trade journal. It is commonly referred to by its abbreviated title, "REM" (pronounced as one word).

History

Current operations
REM is published 12 times a year, and remains independently owned and operated. It is not formally affiliated with any real estate board or association. It is distributed monthly to real estate professionals in Canada through real estate boards and by subscription.

REM regularly features Canadian real estate professionals of note on its front cover, such as singer-songwriters Shauna Sedola and Heidi Vincent, and science-fiction author Rolf Hitzer.

Circulation

References

External links
 Official site

Trade magazines published in Canada
Monthly magazines published in Canada
Professional and trade magazines
Magazines published in Toronto
Magazines established in 1989
1989 establishments in Ontario